Srirastu Subhamastu is a 2016 Indian Telugu-language romantic comedy film directed by Parasuram and produced by Allu Aravind for Geetha Arts banner. The film features Allu Sirish and Lavanya Tripathi in the lead roles alongside Prakash Raj, Rao Ramesh, Tanikella Bharani, Subbaraju, Sumalatha, and Ali in the supporting roles, while Hamsa Nandini appears in an item song. The film opened to mixed to positive reviews.

Plot
Sirish falls in love with Ananya / Anu. He goes to her as a common man where he says that he "lost his purse" and says that she has to help him get his identity, as when he was beating goons for his purse  Anu stops him. One day Anu's friend finds his purse in his back-pack. Sirish reveals to her friend that he is rich and his dad Krishna Mohan said that if Anu fell in love with Sirish without knowing he's rich they would get married. But if she didn't, he would marry a girl of his father's choice. Soon Anu falls in love with Sirish and when she's about to propose, her father says that her godparents would wish that Anu would marry their son Arun. Not wanting to hurt their feelings she accepts. Then Sirish goes to Anu's home in a village to  make Anu confess her feelings to him and choose to marry Srish with the help of ShyamSundar, a marriage broker. And then finally Anu's father learns of Sirish's love and asks him whether his family can take good care of Anu. Sirish realizes even if he marries Anu, she would be treated like an outsider like his sister-in-law and Sirish tells his father about the talk with Anu's Dad. Sirish's father talks to Anu's father and tells them about Sirish's real identity and promises that he changed and realized that his thoughts were wrong and will treat his daughters-in-law as his own daughters from now on. The film ends with Sirish and Anu's marriage.

Cast

Production 
The film was initially titled "Chuttalabbayi", but was dropped as Aadi and Veerabhadram had chosen the same for their next film. Lavanya Tripathi was selected to play the love interest in this film which also has Rao Ramesh in an important role.

Soundtrack

The music was composed by S. Thaman and released by Lahari Music.

Release 
The first–look poster of the film was revealed on Valentine's Day 2016 on social media. The film which was expected to release during the summer of 2016 was finally released on 5 August and received positive reviews.

References 

2016 films
Indian romantic drama films
Films scored by Thaman S
2010s Telugu-language films
Geetha Arts films
Indian family films
2016 romantic drama films
Films directed by Parasuram